{{Speciesbox
| name               = Imbricate bulbophyllum
| image = Bulbophyllum imbricatum - JBM.jpg
| taxon = Bulbophyllum imbricatum
| authority = Lindl. (1841)
| synonyms = 
Bulbophyllum congolense (De Wild.) De Wild. (1921)
Bulbophyllum gilletii (De Wild.) De Wild. (1921)
Bulbophyllum kamerunense Schltr. (1905)
Bulbophyllum laurentianum Kraenzl. ex De Wild. & T. Durand (1899)
Bulbophyllum ledermannii (Kraenzl.) De Wild. (1921)
Bulbophyllum leucorhachis (Rolfe) Schltr. (1905)
Bulbophyllum linderi Summerh. (1935
Bulbophyllum stenorhachis' 'Kraenzl. (1895)Bulbophyllum strobiliferum Kraenzl. (1889)Megaclinium congolense De Wild. (1903)Megaclinium gilletii De Wild. (1903)Megaclinium gillianum De Wild. (1903)Megaclinium hebetatum Kraenzl. (1923)Megaclinium imbricatum (Lindl.) Rolfe  (1897Megaclinium laurentianum (Kraenzl. ex De Wild. & T.Durand) De Wild.  (1903)Megaclinium ledermannii Kraenzl., (1912)Megaclinium leucorhachis Rolfe (1891)Megaclinium strobiliferum (Kraenzl.) Rolfe  (1897)Phyllorkis imbricata (Lindl.) Kuntze (1891)
|}}Bulbophyllum imbricatum'' (imbricate bulbophyllum) is a species of orchid.

External links

imbricatum